Spider-Man: No Way Home (Original Motion Picture Soundtrack) is the film score to the Columbia Pictures / Marvel Studios film Spider-Man: No Way Home composed by Michael Giacchino. The soundtrack album was released by Sony Classical on December 17, 2021.

Background 

Spider-Man: Homecoming (2017) and Far From Home (2019) composer Michael Giacchino was confirmed to score No Way Home in November 2020. On December 9, a single titled "Arachnoverture" was released, with "Exit Through the Lobby" being released the following day. The soundtrack also features music from previous Spider-Man soundtracks by other film composers including Hans Zimmer, James Horner and Danny Elfman, as well as Giacchino's theme for Doctor Strange (2016).

Track listing 
All music composed by Michael Giacchino, unless otherwise noted.

Additional music 
"I Zimbra" by Talking Heads, "Native New Yorker" by Odyssey, "Scraper" by Liquid Liquid, "No Sleep 'Til Brooklyn" by Beastie Boys, "Concerto for 2 Violins in G major, RV 516" by Antonio Vivaldi, "Deck the Halls" by Thomas Oliphant, and "The Magic Number" by De La Soul are featured in the film. "Bailando Cumbia" by Danny Osuna is featured in the mid-credits scene. Numerous tracks from the score of previous Spider-Man films are references in the film, including Danny Elfman's "Main Title" and "Enter the Goblin" from Spider-Man (2002), Elfman's "Doc Ock is Born" from Spider-Man 2 (2004), James Horner's "Main Title – Young Peter" from The Amazing Spider-Man (2012), and Hans Zimmer's "I'm Electro" from The Amazing Spider-Man 2 (2014).

Charts

References 

2021 soundtrack albums
2020s film soundtrack albums
Marvel Cinematic Universe: Phase Four soundtracks
Sony Music soundtracks
Spider-Man film soundtracks
Spider-Man (2017 film series)
Michael Giacchino soundtracks
Sony Classical Records soundtracks